Aldo Iván Dávila Morales (born 20 September 1977) is a Guatemalan politician. He was elected to the Congress of Guatemala in the 2019 election as a member of Winaq. He is the first openly gay man and first HIV-positive member elected to Congress. He will also be the only openly LGBT member of Congress, as Sandra Morán declined to run for re-election.

References

Members of the Congress of Guatemala
Gay politicians
Guatemalan LGBT people
Living people
Guatemalan LGBT rights activists
Guatemalan activists
LGBT legislators
People with HIV/AIDS
1977 births
21st-century LGBT people